The enzyme Rhamnogalacturonan endolyase (rhamnogalacturonase B, α-L-rhamnopyranosyl-(1→4)-α-D-galactopyranosyluronide lyase, Rgase B, rhamnogalacturonan α-Lrhamnopyranosyl-(1,4)-α-D-galactopyranosyluronide lyase, RG-lyase, YesW, RGL4, Rgl11A, Rgl11Y, RhiE) is an enzyme with systematic name α-L-rhamnopyranosyl-(1→4)-α-D-galactopyranosyluronate endolyase. catalyses the following process:

 Endotype eliminative cleavage of L-α-rhamnopyranosyl-(1→4)-α-D-galactopyranosyluronic acid bonds of rhamnogalacturonan I domains in ramified hairy regions of pectin leaving L-rhamnopyranose at the reducing end and 4-deoxy-4,5-unsaturated Dgalactopyranosyluronic acid at the non-reducing end.

The enzyme is part of the degradation system for rhamnogalacturonan I in Bacillus subtilis strain 168 and Aspergillus aculeatus.

References

External links 
 

EC 4.2.2